Philip Moger (born 25 April 1955) is an English bishop of the Catholic Church serving as auxiliary bishop in the Archdiocese of Southwark. He was ordained a priest for the Diocese of Leeds and served as the rector of the Basilica of Our Lady of Walsingham from 2020 - 2023.

Biography

Early life 
Phillip Moger was born in Halifax, West Yorkshire, on 25 April 1955, and was raised mainly by his grandmother after his mother died when he was five. He felt the first call to the priesthood when he was eight years old. He worked briefly for NatWest Bank before becoming a seminarian for the Diocese of Leeds and studying at St Cuthbert's College, Ushaw.

Priesthood 
Moger was ordained a priest for the Diocese of Leeds at St. Mary's church, Halifax, by then-bishop of Leeds Gordon Wheeler in 1982. He served various roles throughout the diocese, including as a parochial vicar, the vocations director for the Diocese, and as a chaplain at a Sue Ryder home. In 2008 he was appointed a prelate of honour, a canon of the chapter of St. Anne Cathedral, and dean of the cathedral. Additionally, he oversaw the liturgical planning for Pope Benedict XVI's 2010 visit to the United Kingdom. In 2020, he became the rector of the Basilica of Our Lady of Walsingham.

He was also named the first Catholic honorary canon of the Church of England's Ripon Cathedral by Bishop John Packer in 2008, as well as serving as the Catholic observer on the Church of England's Liturgical Commission.

Episcopacy 
In November 2022 Pope Francis appointed Moger an auxiliary bishop of the Archdiocese of Southwark, with the titular see of Glastonia. He is scheduled to receive episcopal consecration at St. George Cathedral on 21 February 2023. He was consecrated by Archbishop John Wilson on 21 February 2023 at Southwark Cathedral, with Bishop Marcus Stock and Bishop Paul Hendricks acting as the principal co-consecrators.

References

External links

1955 births
Living people
People from Halifax, West Yorkshire
Alumni of Ushaw College
English Roman Catholic bishops